This is a list of the mammal species recorded in Paraguay. There are 151 mammal species in Paraguay, of which two are endangered, seven are vulnerable, and twelve are near threatened.

The following tags are used to highlight each species' conservation status as assessed by the International Union for Conservation of Nature:

Some species were assessed using an earlier set of criteria. Species assessed using this system have the following instead of near threatened and least concern categories:

Subclass: Theria

Infraclass: Eutheria

Order: Cingulata (armadillos)

The armadillos are small mammals with a bony armoured shell. They are native to the Americas. There are around 20 extant species.

Family: Dasypodidae (armadillos)
Subfamily: Dasypodinae
Genus: Dasypus
 Southern long-nosed armadillo, Dasypus hybridus NT
 Nine-banded armadillo, Dasypus novemcinctus LC
 Seven-banded armadillo, Dasypus septemcinctus LC
Subfamily: Euphractinae
Genus: Chaetophractus
 Screaming hairy armadillo, Chaetophractus vellerosus LC
 Big hairy armadillo, Chaetophractus villosus LC
Genus: Calyptophractus
 Greater fairy armadillo, Calyptophractus retusus NT
Genus: Chlamyphorus
 Greater fairy armadillo, Chlamyphorus retusus NT
Genus: Euphractus
 Six-banded armadillo, Euphractus sexcinctus LC
Subfamily: Tolypeutinae
Genus: Cabassous
 Chacoan naked-tailed armadillo, Cabassous chacoensis NT
 Greater naked-tailed armadillo, Cabassous tatouay LC
Genus: Priodontes
 Giant armadillo, Priodontes maximus VU
Genus: Tolypeutes
 Southern three-banded armadillo, Tolypeutes matacus NT

Order: Pilosa (anteaters, sloths and tamanduas)

The order Pilosa is extant only in the Americas and includes the anteaters, sloths, and tamanduas.

Suborder: Folivora
Family: Bradypodidae (three-toed sloths)
Genus: Bradypus
 Brown-throated three-toed sloth, B. variegatus 
Suborder: Vermilingua
Family: Myrmecophagidae (American anteaters)
Genus: Myrmecophaga
 Giant anteater, M. tridactyla 
Genus: Tamandua
 Southern tamandua, T. tetradactyla

Order: Primates

The order Primates contains humans and their closest relatives: lemurs, lorisoids, monkeys, and apes.

Suborder: Haplorhini
Infraorder: Simiiformes
Parvorder: Platyrrhini
Family: Aotidae
Genus: Aotus
 Azara's night monkey, Aotus azarae LC
Family: Atelidae
Subfamily: Alouattinae
Genus: Alouatta
 Black howler, Alouatta caraya LC
Family: Callithrichidae
Genus: Mico
Black-tailed marmoset, Mico melanurus LC
Family: Cebidae
Subfamily: Cebinae
Genus: Sapajus
 Azaras's capuchin, Sapajus cay LC
Family: Pitheciidae
Subfamily: Callicebinae
Genus: Plecturocebus
 White-coated titi, Plecturocebus pallescens LC

Order: Rodentia (rodents)

Rodents make up the largest order of mammals, with over 40% of mammalian species. They have two incisors in the upper and lower jaw which grow continually and must be kept short by gnawing.

Suborder: Hystricognathi
Family: Erethizontidae (New World porcupines)
Subfamily: Erethizontinae
Genus: Coendou
 Brazilian porcupine, Coendou prehensilis LR/lc
 Paraguaian hairy dwarf porcupine, Coendou spinosus LR/lc
Family: Chinchillidae (viscachas and chinchillas)
Genus: Lagostomus
 Plains viscacha, Lagostomus maximus LR/lc
Family: Caviidae (guinea pigs)
Subfamily: Caviinae
Genus: Cavia
 Brazilian guinea pig, Cavia aperea LR/lc
Subfamily: Dolichotinae
Genus: Dolichotis
 Chacoan mara, Dolichotis salinicola LR/nt
Subfamily: Hydrochoerinae (capybaras and rock cavies)
Genus: Hydrochoerus
 Capybara, Hydrochoerus hydrochaeris LR/lc
Family: Dasyproctidae (agoutis and pacas)
Genus: Dasyprocta
 Azara's agouti, Dasyprocta azarae VU
 Central American agouti, Dasyprocta punctata LR/lc
Family: Cuniculidae
Genus: Cuniculus
 Lowland paca, Cuniculus paca LC
Family: Ctenomyidae
Genus: Ctenomys
 Bolivian tuco-tuco, Ctenomys boliviensis LR/lc
 Conover's tuco-tuco, Ctenomys conoveri LR/lc
 Chacoan tuco-tuco, Ctenomys dorsalis LR/lc
Family: Echimyidae
Subfamily: Dactylomyinae
Genus: Kannabateomys
 Atlantic bamboo rat, Kannabateomys amblyonyx LR/lc
Subfamily: Eumysopinae
Genus: Euryzygomatomys
 Fischer's guiara, Euryzygomatomys spinosus LR/lc
Genus: Proechimys
 Long-tailed spiny rat, Proechimys longicaudatus LR/lc
Genus: Thrichomys
 Punare, Thrichomys apereoides LR/lc
Family: Myocastoridae (coypus)
Genus: Myocastor
 Coypu, Myocastor coypus LR/lc
Suborder: Sciurognathi
Family: Sciuridae (squirrels)
Subfamily: Sciurinae
Tribe: Sciurini
Genus: Sciurus
 Brazilian squirrel, Sciurus aestuans LR/lc
Family: Cricetidae
Subfamily: Sigmodontinae
Genus: Akodon
 Azara's grass mouse, Akodon azarae LR/lc
 Cursor grass mouse, Akodon cursor LR/lc
 Blackish grass mouse, Akodon nigrita LR/lc
 Chaco grass mouse, Akodon toba LR/lc
Genus: Andalgalomys
 Pearson's chaco mouse, Andalgalomys pearsoni LR/lc
Genus: Bolomys
 Hairy-tailed bolo mouse, Bolomys lasiurus LR/lc
Genus: Calomys
 Crafty vesper mouse, Calomys callidus LR/lc
 Large vesper mouse, Calomys callosus LR/lc
 Small vesper mouse, Calomys laucha LR/lc
 Drylands vesper mouse, Calomys musculinus LR/lc
Genus: Graomys
 Gray leaf-eared mouse, Graomys griseoflavus LR/lc
Genus: Holochilus
 Chaco marsh rat, Holochilus chacarius LR/lc
Genus: Oecomys
 Mamore arboreal rice rat, Oecomys mamorae LR/lc
Genus: Oligoryzomys
 Chacoan pygmy rice rat, Oligoryzomys chacoensis LR/lc
 Small-eared pygmy rice rat, Oligoryzomys microtis LR/lc
 Black-footed pygmy rice rat, Oligoryzomys nigripes LR/lc
Genus: Cerradomys
 Terraced rice rat, Cerradomys subflavus LR/lc
Genus: Sooretamys
 Paraguayan rice rat, Sooretamys angouya LR/lc
Genus: Hylaeamys
 Azara's broad-headed rice rat, Hylaeamys megacephalus LR/lc
Genus: Euryoryzomys
 Big-headed rice rat, Euryoryzomys russatus LR/lc
 Elegant rice rat, Euryoryzomys nitidus LR/lc
Genus: Oxymycterus
 Spy hocicudo, Oxymycterus delator LR/lc
Genus: Pseudoryzomys
 Brazilian false rice rat, Pseudoryzomys simplex LR/lc
Genus: Scapteromys
 Waterhouse's swamp rat, Scapteromys tumidus LR/lc

Order: Lagomorpha (lagomorphs)

The lagomorphs comprise two families, Leporidae (hares and rabbits), and Ochotonidae (pikas). Though they can resemble rodents, and were classified as a superfamily in that order until the early 20th century, they have since been considered a separate order. They differ from rodents in a number of physical characteristics, such as having four incisors in the upper jaw rather than two.

Family: Leporidae (rabbits, hares)
Genus: Sylvilagus
 Common tapetí, Sylvilagus brasiliensis EN

Order: Chiroptera (bats)

The bats' most distinguishing feature is that their forelimbs are developed as wings, making them the only mammals capable of flight. Bat species account for about 20% of all mammals.

Family: Noctilionidae
Genus: Noctilio
 Lesser bulldog bat, Noctilio albiventris LR/lc
 Greater bulldog bat, Noctilio leporinus LR/lc
Family: Vespertilionidae
Subfamily: Myotinae
Genus: Myotis
 Silver-tipped myotis, Myotis albescens LR/lc
 Black myotis, Myotis nigricans LR/lc
 Riparian myotis, Myotis riparius LR/lc
 Red myotis, Myotis ruber VU
 Velvety myotis, Myotis simus LR/lc
Subfamily: Vespertilioninae
Genus: Eptesicus
 Brazilian brown bat, Eptesicus brasiliensis LR/lc
 Diminutive serotine, Eptesicus diminutus LR/lc
 Argentine brown bat, Eptesicus furinalis LR/lc
 Big brown bat, Eptesicus fuscus LR/lc
Genus: Histiotus
 Tropical big-eared brown bat, Histiotus velatus LR/lc
Genus: Lasiurus
 Desert red bat, Lasiurus blossevillii LR/lc
 Hoary bat, Lasiurus cinereus LR/lc
 Southern yellow bat, Lasiurus ega LR/lc
Family: Molossidae
Genus: Cynomops
 Cinnamon dog-faced bat, Cynomops abrasus LR/nt
 Southern dog-faced bat, Cynomops planirostris LR/lc
Genus: Eumops
 Dwarf bonneted bat, Eumops bonariensis LR/lc
 Big bonneted bat, Eumops dabbenei LR/lc
 Wagner's bonneted bat, Eumops glaucinus LR/lc
 Western mastiff bat, Eumops perotis LR/lc
Genus: Molossops
 Dwarf dog-faced bat, Molossops temminckii LR/lc
Genus: Molossus
 Black mastiff bat, Molossus ater LR/lc
 Velvety free-tailed bat, Molossus molossus LR/lc
Genus: Nyctinomops
 Peale's free-tailed bat, Nyctinomops aurispinosus LR/lc
 Broad-eared bat, Nyctinomops laticaudatus LR/lc
 Big free-tailed bat, Nyctinomops macrotis LR/lc
Genus: Promops
 Big crested mastiff bat, Promops centralis LR/lc
 Brown mastiff bat, Promops nasutus LR/lc
Genus: Tadarida
 Mexican free-tailed bat, Tadarida brasiliensis LR/nt
Family: Emballonuridae
Genus: Peropteryx
 Lesser doglike bat, Peropteryx macrotis LR/lc
Family: Phyllostomidae
Subfamily: Phyllostominae
Genus: Chrotopterus
 Big-eared woolly bat, Chrotopterus auritus LR/lc
Genus: Lophostoma
 White-throated round-eared bat, Lophostoma silvicolum LR/lc
Genus: Macrophyllum
 Long-legged bat, Macrophyllum macrophyllum LR/lc
Genus: Micronycteris
 Little big-eared bat, Micronycteris megalotis LR/lc
Genus: Phyllostomus
 Pale spear-nosed bat, Phyllostomus discolor LR/lc
 Greater spear-nosed bat, Phyllostomus hastatus LR/lc
Genus: Tonatia
 Greater round-eared bat, Tonatia bidens LR/lc
Subfamily: Glossophaginae
Genus: Glossophaga
 Pallas's long-tongued bat, Glossophaga soricina LR/lc
Subfamily: Carolliinae
Genus: Carollia
 Seba's short-tailed bat, Carollia perspicillata LR/lc
Subfamily: Stenodermatinae
Genus: Artibeus
 Fringed fruit-eating bat, Artibeus fimbriatus LR/nt
 Jamaican fruit bat, Artibeus jamaicensis LR/lc
 Great fruit-eating bat, Artibeus lituratus LR/lc
 Flat-faced fruit-eating bat, Artibeus planirostris LR/lc
Genus: Pygoderma
 Ipanema bat, Pygoderma bilabiatum LR/nt
Genus: Sturnira
 Little yellow-shouldered bat, Sturnira lilium LR/lc
Genus: Vampyressa
 Southern little yellow-eared bat, Vampyressa pusilla LR/lc
Genus: Platyrrhinus
 White-lined broad-nosed bat, Platyrrhinus lineatus LR/lc
Subfamily: Desmodontinae
Genus: Desmodus
 Common vampire bat, Desmodus rotundus LR/lc

Order: Carnivora (carnivorans)

There are over 260 species of carnivorans, the majority of which feed primarily on meat. They have a characteristic skull shape and dentition.

Suborder: Feliformia
Family: Felidae (cats)
Subfamily: Felinae
Genus: Leopardus
Pampas cat L. colocola 
Geoffroy's cat L. geoffroyi 
Ocelot L. pardalis 
Oncilla L. tigrinus 
Margay L. wiedii 
Genus: Herpailurus
Jaguarundi, H. yagouaroundi 
Genus: Puma
Cougar, P. concolor 
Subfamily: Pantherinae
Genus: Panthera
Jaguar, P. onca 
Suborder: Caniformia
Family: Canidae (dogs, foxes)
Genus: Dusicyon
 Dusicyon avus 
Genus: Lycalopex
 Pampas fox, Lycalopex gymnocercus LC
Genus: Cerdocyon
 Crab-eating fox, Cerdocyon thous LC
Genus: Speothos
 Bush dog, Speothos venaticus VU
Genus: Chrysocyon
 Maned wolf, Chrysocyon brachyurus NT
Family: Procyonidae (raccoons)
Genus: Procyon
 Crab-eating raccoon, Procyon cancrivorus
Genus: Nasua
 South American coati, Nasua nasua
Family: Mustelidae (mustelids)
Genus: Galictis
 Lesser grison, Galictis cuja
Genus: Lontra
 Neotropical river otter, Lontra longicaudis DD
Genus: Pteronura
 Giant otter, Pteronura brasiliensis EN
Family: Mephitidae
Genus: Conepatus
 Humboldt's hog-nosed skunk, Conepatus humboldtii

Order: Perissodactyla (odd-toed ungulates)

The odd-toed ungulates are browsing and grazing mammals. They are usually large to very large, and have relatively simple stomachs and a large middle toe.

Family: Tapiridae (tapirs)
Genus: Tapirus
 Brazilian tapir, Tapirus terrestris VU

Order: Artiodactyla (even-toed ungulates)

The even-toed ungulates are ungulates whose weight is borne about equally by the third and fourth toes, rather than mostly or entirely by the third as in perissodactyls. There are about 220 artiodactyl species, including many that are of great economic importance to humans.

Family: Tayassuidae (peccaries)
Genus: Catagonus
 Chacoan peccary, Catagonus wagneri EN
Genus: Dicotyles
 Collared peccary, Dicotyles tajacu LC
Genus: Tayassu
 White-lipped peccary, Tayassu pecari NT
Family: Camelidae (camels, llamas)
Genus: Lama
 Guanaco, Lama guanicoe LR/lc
Family: Cervidae (deer)
Subfamily: Capreolinae
Genus: Blastocerus
 Marsh deer, Blastocerus dichotomus VU
Genus: Mazama
 Red brocket, Mazama americana DD
 Pygmy brocket, Mazama nana DD
Genus: Ozotoceros
 Pampas deer, Ozotoceros bezoarticus NT

Infraclass: Metatheria

Order: Didelphimorphia (common opossums)

Didelphimorphia is the order of common opossums of the Western Hemisphere. Opossums probably diverged from the basic South American marsupials in the late Cretaceous or early Paleocene. They are small to medium-sized marsupials, about the size of a large house cat, with a long snout and prehensile tail.

Family: Didelphidae (American opossums)
Subfamily: Caluromyinae
Genus: Caluromys
 Brown-eared woolly opossum, Caluromys lanatus LR/nt
Subfamily: Didelphinae
Genus: Chironectes
 Water opossum, Chironectes minimus LR/nt
Genus: Didelphis
 White-eared opossum, Didelphis albiventris LR/lc
 Big-eared opossum, Didelphis aurita LR/lc
 Common opossum, Didelphis marsupialis LR/lc
Genus: Gracilinanus
 Agile gracile opossum, Gracilinanus agilis LR/nt
Genus: Lutreolina
 Big lutrine opossum, Lutreolina crassicaudata LR/lc
Genus: Marmosa
 Woolly mouse opossum, Marmosa demerarae LR/lc
 Tate's woolly mouse opossum, Marmosa paraguayana LC
Genus: Metachirus
 Brown four-eyed opossum, Metachirus nudicaudatus LR/lc
Genus: Monodelphis
 Gray short-tailed opossum, Monodelphis domestica LR/lc
 Southern red-sided opossum, Monodelphis sorex VU
Genus: Philander
 Gray four-eyed opossum, Philander opossum LR/lc
Genus: Thylamys
 Paraguayan fat-tailed mouse opossum, Thylamys macrurus LR/nt
 Common fat-tailed mouse opossum, Thylamys pusillus LR/lc

References

External links

See also
List of chordate orders
Lists of mammals by region
List of prehistoric mammals
Mammal classification
List of mammals described in the 2000s

Paraguay
Mammals

Paraguay